Events in the year 1363 in Norway.

Incumbents
Monarch: Haakon VI Magnusson

Events
 April 9 – Haakon VI of Norway marries Margaret I of Denmark.

Arts and literature

Births

Deaths
Blanche of Namur, queen-consort (born c.1320).
Herdis Torvaldsdatter, landowner (born c.1310).

References

Norway